Heby is a locality and the seat of Heby Municipality in Uppsala County, Sweden, with 2,550 inhabitants in 2010.

Sports
The following sports clubs are located in Heby:

 Heby AIF

References 

Municipal seats of Uppsala County
Swedish municipal seats
Populated places in Uppsala County
Populated places in Heby Municipality